Brian John Doyle (18 August 1930 – 1 June 2008) was an Australian  Olympic medal winning rower who competed in the 1956 Summer Olympics.

Rowing career
Doyle took up rowing at Xavier College in Melbourne. He achieved the rare distinction of rowing in Xavier's first VIII at the APS Head of the River in all four of his senior school years from 1946 to 1949. His senior club rowing was with the Mercantile Rowing Club in Melbourne.

Doyle was selected in Victorian state representative King's Cup crews contesting the men's Interstate Eight-Oared Championship at the Australian Rowing Championships on six consecutive occasions from 1952 to 1956. Four of those crews won the King's Cup, with Doyle at stroke on two occasions.

Doyle's was selected in the Australian eight to compete at the 1956 Melbourne Olympics. He stroked the Australian crew to a bronze medal in the final of the eights event.

Coach and administrator
After active rowing Doyle coached many school and club crews at Xavier College and Mercantile. He coached his sons David and Mark to a gold medal won together in a coxless pair at the World Rowing U23 Championships in Vienna in 1982. David and Mark both became rowing Olympians, Mark a world champion.

Doyle was vice-captain of the Mercantile club for a period and chairman of selectors during the 1980s. In 2010 he was inducted as a member of the Rowing Victoria Hall of Fame.

References

External links
Brian Doyle's profile at Sports Reference.com
Notice of Brian Doyle's death

1930 births
2008 deaths
Australian male rowers
Olympic rowers of Australia
Rowers at the 1956 Summer Olympics
Olympic bronze medalists for Australia
Olympic medalists in rowing
Medalists at the 1956 Summer Olympics
Australian rowing coaches
20th-century Australian people